The Siamese–Vietnamese wars were a series of armed conflicts between the Siamese Ayutthaya Kingdom and Rattanakosin Kingdom and the various dynasties of Vietnam mainly during the 18th and 19th centuries. Several of the wars took place in modern-day Cambodia.

The political, dynastic, and military decline of the Khmer Empire after the 15th century, known as the Post-Angkor Period, left a power vacuum in the Mekong floodplains of central Indochina. United under strong dynastic rule, both Siam to the west and Vietnam to the east sought to achieve hegemony in the lowland region and the Lao mountains. The Siamese introduced – and Vietnam soon followed – the hostage system for Cambodian royals, who were relocated to their courts, actively undermining royal affairs and shaping future Cambodian policies. Eventually, territory was annexed by both powers, who conceived, maintained and supported their favorable Cambodian puppet kings. Actual combat mainly took place on Cambodian territory or on occupied lands. The 19th-century establishment of French Indochina put an end to Vietnamese sovereignty and to Siamese policies of regional expansion. Subsequent clashes of the two countries were not caused by regional rivalry, but must be viewed in the context of the 20th-century imperial policies of foreign great powers and the Cold War.

Prelude
The roots of the conflict started at the beginning of the 14th century, when Tai people busily expanded their states and came to clash with established Vietnamese state in the east. During the latter centuries, as the Vietnamese expanding southward to the lower Mekong, they came to conflict with Cambodia and the Siamese state.

List of Siamese-Vietnamese wars

See also
 Burmese–Siamese wars
 History of the Cham–Vietnamese wars
 Nam tiến
 History of Thailand
 History of Vietnam
 Military history of Thailand
 Military history of Vietnam
 Thailand–Vietnam relations

Notes

Citations

References

Wars involving Thailand
Wars involving Vietnam
Wars involving the Đại Việt Kingdom
Military history of Vietnam
Military history of Thailand
Thailand–Vietnam military relations